"Johnny Johnny Yes Papa" is an English-language nursery rhyme. The song is about a child, Johnny, who is caught by his father eating sugar when he is not supposed to. Versions of this song comprising more than one verse usually continue with variations on this theme.

History 
A 1989 book by the American scholar and professor Francelia Butler records the nursery rhyme being told in Kenya in 1980. According to Vinoth Chandar, the CEO of ChuChu TV, it was already old enough to have been in the public domain in India by 2018, indicating that it would have been at least 60 years old (per Indian copyright law); Chandar wrote in 2018 that he "used to hear it" as a child, and that elderly people would also have listened to it as children.

Lyrics 
The lyrics to the song are in a call and response format, and typically sung to the tune of "Twinkle, Twinkle, Little Star". The original and most well-known version of the song is:

YouTube videos 
The song was featured on YouTube in 2007, where it was used in an Indian commercial for the 5 Star chocolate brand.

It was also featured on YouTube as a nursery rhyme in 2009 by the channel Shemrock Nursery Rhymes.

The nursery rhyme has been recreated by many other edutainment YouTube channels targeting young children. As of 20 August 2020, a video containing the song, misspelt as "Johny" and uploaded to YouTube by Loo Loo Kids in 2016, has more than 5.7 billion views, making it the third-most-viewed video on the site, as well as the most-viewed nursery rhyme video and one of the top 10 most-disliked YouTube videos. Another video of the song, uploaded by ChuChu TV in 2014, has more than 1.7 billion views, another uploaded by CVS 3D Rhymes in 2017 has over 1.2 billion views, and a further video in Spanish uploaded by FAMA JAMA has over a billion views. Another video was listed in 2015 by The Daily Dot as one of eleven "unintentionally disturbing" YouTube videos for children.

A parody of the nursery rhyme was uploaded by the user EdukayFUN on October 9, 2014. It uses intentionally uncanny CGI animation and ends with Johnny being eaten by his father. The channel was terminated in 2018, but still uploads videos as EdukayFUN 2.0. The original parody video was reuploaded in June 2020 in 4K HD.

Internet meme

Dancing 
The song became an internet meme in August 2018, with one version by the Indian channel Billion Surprise Toys—a company with 49 million subscribers to its YouTube channel—going particularly viral on Twitter. This version prominently features Johny and his father doing popular dance moves such as the "Gangnam Style" dance, and intertwines the original lyrics with a repeated "doo-doo-doo-da-doo" to the melody of "Baby Shark". The various videos by edutainment channels were subsequently described as "terrifying", "disturbing", "nonsensical" and "a godforsaken nightmare". The song's popularity has been attributed to the Elsagate phenomenon of potentially disturbing or absurd YouTube videos being algorithmically shown to children through the YouTube website and the YouTube Kids app. The Verge, Mashable and New York Magazine found "remixes" by Billion Surprise Toys, one featuring an anthropomorphic refrigerator (as the liar), to be particularly absurd, even when compared to other "Johny Johny Yes Papa" videos. The Verge went on further to explain that "Each video features a child and their family lying to one another as a form of affection."

Shortly after the song went viral, Billion Surprise Toys began to issue aggressive DMCA takedown requests for videos and images derived from its own videos published on social media. This move was considered controversial for various reasons. Firstly, because of the unclear copyright status of the song itself, secondly because American copyright law permits parodies as a form of fair use, and thirdly, because the UAE (Billion Surprise Toys' native country) allows for "The reproduction of the work for the purpose of personal, non-profit and non-professional use" under their fair use laws.

See also
Elsagate

References 

English nursery rhymes
Songs about children
Traditional children's songs
English children's songs
Kenyan songs
Internet memes introduced in 2018
Nursery rhymes of uncertain origin
Indian intellectual property law
Public domain music